Alphonsine (pseudonym for Jeanne Benoit) (1829 – 10 July 1883) was a French actress. She made her theatrical debut at the Gymnase-Enfantin, an entertainment venue formerly located near the Passage de l'Opéra (Galerie du Baromètre, leading to the Salle Le Peletier) in the 9th arrondissement of Paris.

She was described as "one of the most original artistes of our time".

She appeared at the Théâtre des Délassements-Comiques, Théâtre des Variétés and the Théâtre du Palais-Royal.

A widow of the painter Victor Margaine, she was buried at Père Lachaise Cemetery.

Theatres 
 Voilà l'plaisir Mesdames !, Théâtre des Délassements-Comiques
 Les Amours de Cléopâtre, Théâtre des Variétés
 L'Infortunée Caroline, Théâtre des Variétés
 Les Bibelots du Diable, Théâtre des Variétés
 L'homme n'est pas parfait by Lambert-Thiboust, Théâtre des Variétés
 Monsieur Alphonse by Alexandre Dumas fils, Théâtre du Gymnase
 Giroflé-Girofla by Charles Lecocq, Théâtre de la Renaissance
 La petite mariée, Théâtre de la Renaissance
 La Reine indigo, Théâtre de la Renaissance
 Les 500 diables by Dumanoir and Adolphe d'Ennery, Théâtre de la Gaité, féerie in 3 acts, 1854, role of Princesse Castorina

References 

19th-century French actresses
French stage actresses
Actresses from Paris
1829 births
1883 deaths
Burials at Père Lachaise Cemetery